During the 1979–80 English football season, Arsenal F.C. competed in the Football League First Division.

Season summary
The season started with a defeat at Wembley in the Charity Shield in August 1979. Arsenal finished the league season in fourth place in the First Division. With fifth placed Nottingham Forest qualifying for the following year's European Cup as holders after winning it again at the end of May and sixth placed Wolverhampton Wanderers having qualified for the UEFA Cup as winners of the League Cup, Arsenal were the only team in the top six not to qualify for Europe. It's a record that still stands. No team has played a 70-match season before or since in England. Arsenal played 70 games throughout the course of the 1979/80, including 27 Cup games, of which two were Cup Finals against West Ham and Valencia; the two happening within the space of five days. Despite finishing in fourth place in the league, they only scored 52 goals in 42 matches. Arsenal drew sixteen games throughout the league season, ten of them at home. In cup competitions, they drew a total of ten matches. Alan Sunderland finished the season as top goalscorer with 29, but only 14 of these came in the league.

Squad

Results

FA Charity Shield

As FA Cup winners, Arsenal contested the 1979 FA Charity Shield against League champions Liverpool.  Liverpool won the match on 11 August 1979 by 3–1.

First Division

Football League Cup

FA Cup

Arsenal entered the FA Cup in the third round proper, in which they were drawn to face Cardiff City.

European Cup Winners' Cup

Top scorers

First Division
  Alan Sunderland 14
  Frank Stapleton 14
  Liam Brady 7

References

External links
 Arsenal 1979–80 on statto.com

Arsenal
Arsenal F.C. seasons